The list of Haunted PS1 games includes  video games created by independent developers for the annual Haunted PS1 series of compilations, curated by Irish video game developer Breogán Hackett. The first compilation, Haunted PS1 Demo Disc 2020, was released on 6 February 2020 on the platform itch.io, containing seventeen horror games from various independent developers. Games published under the Haunted PS1 series of releases have received attention as representative of the emerging genre of independent horror games influenced by the graphics of the PlayStation, as well as important to bringing critical and commercial attention to independent horror games generally.

List

See also
Haunted PS1

References

Haunted PS1